The Aquitaine Regional Council was the Conseil régional of Aquitaine (France). It included 85 members. It was replaced by the Regional Council of Nouvelle-Aquitaine in 2016.

Seats

By Department
36 councillors for Gironde
17 councillors for Pyrénées-Atlantiques
12 councillors for Dordogne
10 councillors for Lot-et-Garonne
10 councillors for Landes

Elections

2004

Past Regional Councils

1998

1992

1986

Past Presidents
 Jacques Chaban-Delmas (1974-1979)
 André Labarrère (1979-1981)
 Philippe Madrelle (1981-1985)
 Jacques Chaban-Delmas (1985-1988)
 Jean Tavernier (1988-1992)
 Jacques Valade (1992-1998)
 Alain Rousset (1998-)

Politics of Aquitaine
Aquitaine